Sir Horace Tozer  (23 April 1844 – 20 August 1916) was an Australian lawyer and politician. He was a Member of the Queensland Legislative Assembly.

Early life
Tozer was son of H. T. N. Tozer, and was born at Port Macquarie, New South Wales, in April 1844. Educated at the Collegiate School, Newcastle, he was admitted to practise as a solicitor at Brisbane in 1866. He settled at Gympie, established a successful practice. He married twice, in 1868 at Ipswich to Mary Hoyles Wilson (who died in Ipswich in 1878), and in 1880 to Louisa Lord (who died in London in 1908).

Political life

In the 1871 election held on 13 July, the sitting member for Wide Bay in the Queensland Legislative Assembly, Henry Edward King, decided to contest the electoral district of Maryborough instead of Wide Bay. King supported the nomination of Horace Tozer for Wide Bay, amidst allegations that Tozer was just a "warming pan" intended to hold the seat as a protection against King failing to win Maryborough. Tozer was elected in Wide Bay but King's bid for Maryborough failed. The allegations of Tozer being a "warming pan" proved true as Tozer promptly resigned, recommending that the electors of Wide Bay should elect King at the subsequent by-election. King's nomination was unopposed and he was declared elected on 4 October 1871.

In 1880, Tozer was elected was an alderman in Gympie's first town council.

On 17 May 1888 he was elected again as the member for Wide Bay, and was colonial secretary in the second Griffith ministry from August 1890 to March 1893, held the same position in the McIlwraith–Nelson ministry until October 1893, and was home secretary in the Nelson ministry until March 1898.

In 1895, he brought in a very moderate shops early closing bill which passed the assembly but was rejected by the legislative council. In the following year, however, he succeeded in passing a factories and shops act which, though it did not go very far, was important on account of its being the first Queensland act regulating hours and conditions. In the same year under his direction the public library and the national art gallery were founded at Brisbane. He was created K.C.M.G. in 1897.

On 2 March 1898, he resigned his seat in order to be appointed as Agent-General for Queensland. He held the position with ability until 1909, when he retired on account of failing health.

Later years and death
He returned to Queensland and died at the home of his daughter, Amy Lavinia Norton in South Brisbane on 20 August 1916. He was survived by two sons and two daughters. A private funeral was held and he was buried in Toowong Cemetery.

His son Vivian Tozer also served in the Queensland Legislative Assembly, representing Gympie.

Tozer's legal offices in Gympie (Tozer's Building) is listed on the Queensland Heritage Register.

References 

1844 births
1916 deaths
Knights Commander of the Order of St Michael and St George
Burials at Toowong Cemetery
Members of the Queensland Legislative Assembly